Jonathan Bardottier (born 7 February 1992) is a Mauritian athlete. He competed in the men's 100 metres event at the 2019 World Athletics Championships.

References

External links

1992 births
Living people
Mauritian male sprinters
Place of birth missing (living people)
World Athletics Championships athletes for Mauritius
Athletes (track and field) at the 2019 African Games
African Games competitors for Mauritius